ASVOFF, or A Shaded View on Fashion Film, is a fashion film festival founded by journalist Diane Pernet. Since its 2008 debut at the Jeu de Paume National Gallery, it is a three-day festival event showcasing feature films, documentaries, conferences, performances and installations. Participants thus far have included the likes of Mike Figgis, Alejandro Jodorowsky, Erwin Olaf, Nobuyoshi Araki, Wing Shya, Steven Klein, Chris Cunningham, Chloë Sevigny, Ruth Hogben, Georgie Greville, Elisha Smith-Leverock, Waris Ahluwalla, Maison Yves Saint Laurent, Nick Knight, Johan Renck, Jerry Schatzberg, William Klein, Tim Yip, Larry Clark, Ellen Von Unwerth, Bruce Weber, Inez van Lamsweerde and Vinoodh Matadin, Indrani, Rossy de Palma and Michael Nyman.

The festival's main venue, save for one year where it was hosted in Nu Boyana Film Studios, is Paris, but since its beginnings, it participates in fashion movements and events the world over, hosted by institutions such as the Bilbao Guggenheim museum, Milan's Palazzo Morando, and the New York Scope art fair. It also has enjoyed the support of sponsors such as Italian Vogue, Bulgari, Kering and Dom Perignon.

Founder 
Diane Pernet's first degree was in documentary film making at Temple University, and she has been making small low-fi movies for years. She also worked as a costume designer for, amongst others, director Amos Gitai. So the founder of ASVOFF knows how important fashion is in a film.

History 
Mark Eley of Eley Kishimoto commissioned her to make a road movie for the launch of his new menswear line. It was a short film that documented his participation in the GUMBALL 3000 which was a car race that went from London to Monte Carlo. The 18-minute film was called The Adventure of Pleasure.

She showed the film to Dino Dinco, her Los Angeles collaborator at the time, and he asked her if she wanted to screen it in Los Angeles. A day later EGR (Enrique Gonzalez Rangel), her Mexico City contributor, sent her a fashion film that he made, and Pernet posted it on her blog. The idea to create a travelling fashion film festival had been on the back burner for years before Pernet showed Adventure of Pleasure to Dinco. The name "You Wear It Well"  was based on a Rod Stewart song. The first fashion film festival, "You Wear It Well", launched in August 2006, premiering in Los Angeles at Cinespace. Dinco and Pernet arranged a second edition of "You Wear It Well" in 2007.

Besides the work of Diane Pernet and EGR, You Wear It Well featured video creations from Maison Martin Margiela, Nick Knight/Alexander McQueen, Jeremy Scott, Bernhard Willhelm, Marcelo Krasilcic, Jean-Charles de Castelbajac, NOKI and Ruben Toledo.

In November 2007 Diane Pernet also co-curated the NOOVO fashion and photography festival in Santiago de Compostela.
"You Wear It Well" was dissolved in 2007 when Pernet with the support of her current producer, David Herman, took the festival from a one-day program to a three-day program and to make it an extension of the ASVOF blog, hence the name ASVOFF (A Shaded View on Fashion Film). In September 2008, ASVOFF was launched in Paris at Jeu de Paume.

ASVOFF Association 
In December, 2013 ASVOFF became an association with the following members: president-Emmanuel Asmar, vice president, founder and director – Diane Pernet, secretary – David Herman and treasurer – Vincent Gagliostro.

Future 
Pernet wants ASVOFF to be an extension of other film festivals around the world. That would be a way to promote new filmmakers just like she has done for new designers with her blog.

ASVOFF Venues 
{
"type": "FeatureCollection",
"features": [
{ "type": "Feature", "properties": { "title": "Bilbao", "description": "2008at the Guggenheim Museum", "marker-size":"small" }, "geometry": { "type": "Point", "coordinates": [ -2.9349852, 43.263012600000017 ] } },
{ "type": "Feature", "properties": { "title": "Barcelona", "description": "2012with CaixaForum", "marker-size":"small" }, "geometry": { "type": "Point", "coordinates": [ 2.17340350000002, 41.3850639 ] } },
{ "type": "Feature", "properties": { "title": "Cannes", "description": "2016–2017at the Cannes Film Festival croisette's Villa Schweppes", "marker-size":"small" }, "geometry": { "type": "Point", "coordinates": [ 7.017369, 43.552847 ] } },
{ "type": "Feature", "properties": { "title": "ParisPassage du Desir, BETC", "description": "2009–2011main venue in 2009annex between 2010–2011", "marker-color":"#000" }, "geometry": { "type": "Point", "coordinates": [ 2.354438975440799,48.8708064315806 ] } },
{ "type": "Feature", "properties": { "title": "ParisCentre Georges pompidou", "description": "2009–2015main venue between 2011–2015awards ceremony, screening in 2009", "marker-color":"#000" }, "geometry": { "type": "Point", "coordinates": [ 2.352587132029595, 48.86046395480422 ] } },
{ "type": "Feature", "properties": { "title": "ParisClub de l'Etoile", "description": "2018", "marker-color":"#000" }, "geometry": { "type": "Point", "coordinates": [ 2.292557861868885,48.8739970714017 ] } },
{ "type": "Feature", "properties": { "title": "ParisPalais Brongniart", "description": "2017", "marker-size":"small" }, "geometry": { "type": "Point", "coordinates": [ 2.338094267079998,48.86710387531 ] } },
{ "type": "Feature", "properties": { "title": "Parisla Gaîté lyrique", "description": "2013", "marker-size":"small" }, "geometry": { "type": "Point", "coordinates": [ 2.350515913550986,48.8644006601632 ] } },
{ "type": "Feature", "properties": { "title": "Pariswith the Champs-Élysées Film Festival", "description": "2014", "marker-size":"small" }, "geometry": { "type": "Point", "coordinates": [ 2.300651478046356,48.8672812835348 ] } },
{ "type": "Feature", "properties": { "title": "ParisJeu de Paume", "description": "2008 Premiere", "marker-color":"#000" }, "geometry": { "type": "Point", "coordinates": [ 2.321188169685554,48.86364052726421 ] } },
{ "type": "Feature", "properties": { "title": "Hyères", "description": "2008International Festival of Fashion and Photography,", "marker-size":"small" }, "geometry": { "type": "Point", "coordinates": [ 6.128639, 43.120541 ] } },
{ "type": "Feature", "properties": { "title": "London", "description": "2010at the Barbican Art Gallery", "marker-size":"small" }, "geometry": { "type": "Point", "coordinates": [ -0.1277583, 51.5073509 ] } },
{ "type": "Feature", "properties": { "title": "London", "description": "2009at the Chelsea Arts Club", "marker-size":"small" }, "geometry": { "type": "Point", "coordinates": [ -0.1277583, 51.5073509 ] } },
{ "type": "Feature", "properties": { "title": "Rome", "description": "2014with AltaRoma", "marker-size":"small" }, "geometry": { "type": "Point", "coordinates": [ 12.4963655, 41.902783500000012 ] } },
{ "type": "Feature", "properties": { "title": "Rome", "description": "2018Palazzo Altemps ", "marker-size":"small" }, "geometry": { "type": "Point", "coordinates": [ 12.4963655, 41.902783500000012 ] } },
{ "type": "Feature", "properties": { "title": "Venice", "description": "2012Circuito-Off, Venice International Short Film Festival", "marker-size":"small" }, "geometry": { "type": "Point", "coordinates": [ 12.3155151, 45.440847400000017 ] } },
{ "type": "Feature", "properties": { "title": "Milano", "description": "2010at the Palazzo Morando with Vogue Italia", "marker-size":"small" }, "geometry": { "type": "Point", "coordinates": [ 9.189982, 45.464203500000011 ] } },
{ "type": "Feature", "properties": { "title": "Athens", "description": "2013with Fashion Workshop by Vicky KayaFashion on Screen", "marker-size":"small" }, "geometry": { "type": "Point", "coordinates": [ 23.7275388, 37.983809599999987 ] } },
{ "type": "Feature", "properties": { "title": "Tokyo", "description": "2013Cinema Rise X in Tokyo", "marker-size":"small" }, "geometry": { "type": "Point", "coordinates": [ 139.650310600000012, 35.6761919 ] } },
{ "type": "Feature", "properties": { "title": "Shanghai", "description": "2016at the China Academy of Art,Shanghai Institute of Design,the West Bund Art Center,the Power Station of Art, andthe Shanghai Himalayas Museum", "marker-size":"small" }, "geometry": { "type": "Point", "coordinates": [ 121.473701, 31.230416 ] } },
{ "type": "Feature", "properties": { "title": "Seoul", "description": "2010Daily Projects", "marker-size":"small" }, "geometry": { "type": "Point", "coordinates": [ 126.9779692, 37.566535 ] } },
{ "type": "Feature", "properties": { "title": "Boston", "description": "2016at the Museum of Fine Arts", "marker-size":"small" }, "geometry": { "type": "Point", "coordinates": [ -71.05888010000001, 42.3600825 ] } },
{ "type": "Feature", "properties": { "title": "Chicago", "description": "2015at the Gene Siskel Film Center", "marker-size":"small" }, "geometry": { "type": "Point", "coordinates": [ -87.6297982, 41.87811360000002 ] } },
{ "type": "Feature", "properties": { "title": "New York", "description": "2014Scope Art Fair in New York,with films by Michael Nyman", "marker-size":"small" }, "geometry": { "type": "Point", "coordinates": [ -74.0059728, 40.7127753 ] } },
{ "type": "Feature", "properties": { "title": "Miami", "description": "2011with Art Basel", "marker-size":"small" }, "geometry": { "type": "Point", "coordinates": [ -80.1917902, 25.761679799999989 ] } },
{ "type": "Feature", "properties": { "title": "Montreal", "description": "2013Festival du Nouveau Cinema", "marker-size":"small" }, "geometry": { "type": "Point", "coordinates": [ -73.567256, 45.501688900000012 ] } },
{ "type": "Feature", "properties": { "title": "Mexico City", "description": "2014with Trendsétera, Museo Franz Mayer", "marker-size":"small" }, "geometry": { "type": "Point", "coordinates": [ -99.133208, 19.4326077 ] } },
{ "type": "Feature", "properties": { "title": "Vienna", "description": "2012with Frame 0ut, Museum Quarter", "marker-size":"small" }, "geometry": { "type": "Point", "coordinates": [ 16.3738189, 48.208174299999989 ] } },
{ "type": "Feature", "properties": { "title": "Munich", "description": "2013with ABSOLUTE Creatives", "marker-size":"small" }, "geometry": { "type": "Point", "coordinates": [ 11.5819805, 48.135125300000013 ] } },
{ "type": "Feature", "properties": { "title": "Antwerp", "description": "2014with MoMu at MUSE", "marker-size":"small" }, "geometry": { "type": "Point", "coordinates": [ 4.402464299999989, 51.219447499999987 ] } },
{ "type": "Feature", "properties": { "title": "Arnhem", "description": "2013Arnhem Biennale", "marker-size":"small" }, "geometry": { "type": "Point", "coordinates": [ 5.8987296, 51.9851034 ] } },
{ "type": "Feature", "properties": { "title": "Amsterdam", "description": "2009with MASS", "marker-size":"small" }, "geometry": { "type": "Point", "coordinates": [ 4.9035614, 52.36798430000001 ] } },
{ "type": "Feature", "properties": { "title": "Copenhagen", "description": "2014with CPH DOX", "marker-size":"small" }, "geometry": { "type": "Point", "coordinates": [ 12.5683372, 55.676096799999968 ] } },
{ "type": "Feature", "properties": { "title": "Sofia", "description": "2017Nuboyana Film Studios", "marker-color":"#000" }, "geometry": { "type": "Point", "coordinates": [ 23.321867499999978, 42.697708199999987 ] } },
{ "type": "Feature", "properties": { "title": "Riga", "description": "2008with Moments", "marker-size":"small" }, "geometry": { "type": "Point", "coordinates": [ 24.1051865, 56.949648700000019 ] } },
{ "type": "Feature", "properties": { "title": "Cluj", "description": "2010with the Transylvania National Theatre", "marker-size":"small" }, "geometry": { "type": "Point", "coordinates": [ 23.623635299999972, 46.771210100000012 ] } },
{ "type": "Feature", "properties": { "title": "Łódź", "description": "2014LODZ Fashion Philosophy Week", "marker-size":"small" }, "geometry": { "type": "Point", "coordinates": [ 19.455983300000021, 51.759248500000012 ] } },
{ "type": "Feature", "properties": { "title": "Tbilisi", "description": "2011Georgian Fashion Week", "marker-size":"small" }, "geometry": { "type": "Point", "coordinates": [ 44.827096, 41.715137700000028 ] } },
{ "type": "Feature", "properties": { "title": "Bratislava", "description": "2019Bratislava Film Festival", "marker-size":"small" }, "geometry": { "type": "Point", "coordinates": [ 17.1077478, 48.1485965 ] } },
{ "type": "Feature", "properties": { "title": "Moscow", "description": "2010Russian Fashion Week", "marker-size":"small" }, "geometry": { "type": "Point", "coordinates": [ 37.617299899999978, 55.755826 ] } },
{ "type": "Feature", "properties": { "title": "Saint Petersburg", "description": "2013during Aurora Fashion Week", "marker-size":"small" }, "geometry": { "type": "Point", "coordinates": [ 30.33509860000002, 59.9342802 ] } },
{ "type": "Feature", "properties": { "title": "Kyiv", "description": "2010with Elle Ukraine", "marker-size":"small" }, "geometry": { "type": "Point", "coordinates": [ 30.5234, 50.4501 ] } },
{ "type": "Feature", "properties": { "title": "Minsk", "description": "2012Belarus Fashion Week", "marker-size":"small" }, "geometry": { "type": "Point", "coordinates": [ 27.56152440000001, 53.904539799999988 ] } },
{ "type": "Feature", "properties": { "title": "Vladivostok", "description": "2013with the Ministry of Culture of Russiaand Aurora Fashion Week", "marker-size":"small" }, "geometry": { "type": "Point", "coordinates": [ 131.8869243, 43.119809099999983 ] } }
]
}
Besides its annual festival in Paris in September, ASVOFF has other projects around the world.

Other places on the ASVOFF list:

Main Venues
 2008 – Paris, premiere at the Jeu de Paume museum
 2009 – Paris Passage du Désir, Awards ceremony at the Centre Georges Pompidou
 2010–2011 – Paris Centre Georges Pompidou, Passage du Désir
 2012–2015 – Paris Centre Georges Pompidou
 2016–2017 – Cannes la Croisette
 2018 – Paris Club de l'Etoile

Satellite Venues
 2008 – Bilbao at the Guggenheim Museum
 2008 – Riga, with Moments
 2009 – London at the Chelsea Arts Club
 2009 – Amsterdam, with MASS
 2010 – Milano at the Palazzo Morando with Vogue Italia
 2010 – Hyères International Festival of Fashion and Photography,
 2010 – London at the Barbican Art Gallery
 2010 – Kyiv, with Elle Ukraine
 2010 – Seoul, Daily Projects
 2010 – Cluj, with Transylvania National Theatre
 2010 – Moscow, Russian Fashion Week
 2010 – Milan at the Cine Opera at Corso Como, with films by Michael Nyman
 2011 – Miami, with Art Basel
 2011 – Tbilisi, Georgian Fashion Week
 2012 – Venice, Circuito-Off, Venice International Short Film Festival
 2012 – Minsk, Belarus Fashion Week
 2012 – Vienna, with Frame 0ut, Museum Quarter
 2012 – Barcelona, with CaixaForum

 2013 – Athens, with Fashion Workshop by Vicky Kaya Fashion on Screen
 2013 – Munich, with ABSOLUTE Creatives
 2013 – Tokyo at Cinema Rise X in Tokyo
 2013 – Cannes at the Cannes Film Festival croisette's Villa Schweppes
 2013 – Saint Petersburg Aurora Fashion Week
 2013 – Montreal, Festival du Nouveau Cinema
 2013 – Arnhem, Arnhem Biennale
 2013 – Vladivostok, with the Ministry of Culture of Russia and Aurora Fashion Week
 2013 – Paris, la Gaîté lyrique
 2014 – New York Scope Art Fair in New York, with films by Michael Nyman
 2014 – Copenhagen, with CPH DOX

 2014 – Łódź, LODZ Fashion Philosophy Week
 2014 – Antwerp, with MoMu at MUSE
 2014 – Mexico City, with Trendsétera, Museo Franz Mayer
 2014 – Paris, in collaboration with Champs-Élysées Film Festival
 2014 – Rome, with AltaRoma
 2015 – Chicago at the Gene Siskel Film Center
 2016 – Boston at the Museum of Fine Arts
 2016 – Shanghai at the China Academy of Art, Shanghai Institute of Design, the West Bund Art Center, the Power Station of Art, and the Shanghai Himalayas Museum
 2017 – Sofia, Nuboyana Film Studios
 2017 – Paris, Palais Brongniart
 2018 – Rome, Palazzo Altemps 
 2019 – Bratislava, Bratislava Film Festival

Editions

References

External links 
 ASVOFF.com
 MikeFiggis.co.uk
 MichaelNyman.com
 MariaDeMedeiros.net
 RickOwens.eu
 Knack Weekend: a comparative article on fashion film and the 80s music video
 The Independent.co.uk: fashion events in October 2009
 Gsus Lopez – film director – (ASVOFF Barcelona 2012 Grand Prix Winner)

Fashion events in France
Film festivals in Paris